The Daysan River or Daisan River was the name of the river that flowed through Urfa, a tributary of the Khabur. Historically known as the Scirtus, Procopius describes it as a river of Mesopotamia, a western tributary of the Chaboras (modern Khabur). It flowed from 25 sources, and ran past Edessa. (Chron. Edess. in Asseman, Bibl. Or. i. p. 388.) Its name, which signifies the skipping or jumping (from σκιρτάω), is said to have been derived from its rapid course and its frequent overflowings; and its present name of Daysan or Daisan means the same thing.  The river has flooded Edessa numerous times, including in 204, 305, and 415 CE. The Syriac writer Bardaisan takes his name from the river.

References

Rivers of Turkey
Edessa
Tributaries of the Khabur (Euphrates)